Tennis was inducted at the Youth Olympic Games at the inaugural edition in 2010. The program included four competitions: Boys' singles, Boys' doubles, Girls' singles and Girls' doubles. The 2014 edition added a Mixed doubles event. Players from different National Olympic Committees are allowed to participate in doubles events.

Medal table
As of the 2018 Summer Youth Olympics.

Results

Current events

Boys' singles

Boys' doubles

Girls' singles

Girls' doubles

Mixed doubles

Medal summary (2010–2014)

See also
Tennis at the Summer Olympics

External links
Youth Olympic Games

 
Youth Olympics
Tennis